Jhonny Alexandre Arteaga (born 24 November 1986) is a Colombian former footballer and current football coach.

Career

Youth and College
Arteaga grew up in Stamford, Connecticut, where he attended Westhill High School before playing college soccer at Dominican College (New York). In 2005, 2006 and 2007, Arteaga received All CACC Honors, and NSCAA All Region Honors in 2006 and 2007. During his Senior Year, Arteaga Led the CACC in Points (38) & in Goals (16). Following his Senior Year, Arteaga was Honored CACC Player of the Year, Daktronic's 1st Team All Region and 1st Team All American.

During his college years, Arteaga also played with the Albany BWP Highlanders in the USL Premier Development League.

Professional
Arteaga turned professional in 2008 playing with the Western Mass Pioneers in the USL Second Division, and made his professional debut on 19 April 2008 in the Pioneers' 3–0 opening day defeat to the Richmond Kickers. He left the club mid-season, and briefly played back in the PDL for Westchester Flames, before leaving for Europe to attempt to secure a professional contract.

Arteaga was trialed with Polish Ekstraklasa club Lechia Gdańsk in early 2010, before signing with Łomża. He played 14 games for Łomża in 2010 and scored 8 goals, before returning to the United States at the end of the season.

Arteaga signed with F.C. New York in the USL Professional Division in 2011. He scored his first goal for New York on 30 May 2011 in a 2–1 victory over Rochester Rhinos. He recorded his first professional hat trick on 15 June 2011 in a 3–0 victory over former club Western Mass Pioneers in New York's 2011 U.S. Open Cup debut. Arteaga ended the season playing in 21 league games for New York in 2011, and was the league's top scorer with 13 goals setting a single-season scoring record (16 in all competitions).

On 5 March 2012 it was announced that Arteaga had agreed to terms with New York Red Bulls of Major League Soccer. On 19 November 2012, the Red Bulls announced it declined options for an additional 6 players, having released 4 a week earlier, with Arteaga included in the mix.

On 22 February 2013, it was announced that Arteaga signed a 2-year contract with the Pittsburgh Riverhounds.

Coaching 
On 5 July 2016 Arteaga was named assistant coach of the Iona Gaels Men's Soccer program which competes in the NCAA Division I.

Jhonny Arteaga is the Owner and Coaching Director of JA Elite Soccer Academy LLC which he founded in 2011. JA Elite Soccer Academy is a youth soccer training company based out of Stamford, CT.

Honors
 USL Pro Golden Boot: 2011
 USL Pro Scoring Champion: 2011
 USL Pro All-League First Team: 2011

References

External links

Colombian footballers
Major League Soccer players
Western Mass Pioneers players
Westchester Flames players
Albany BWP Highlanders players
ŁKS Łomża players
F.C. New York players
New York Red Bulls players
Pittsburgh Riverhounds SC players
USL League Two players
USL Second Division players
USL Championship players
Expatriate footballers in Poland
Expatriate soccer players in the United States
Colombian expatriate sportspeople in Poland
1986 births
Living people
Association football forwards
Footballers from Cali